Tarnalelesz is a village (község) in Heves County, Northern Hungary Region, Hungary.

Populated places in Heves County